Minuscule 814 (in the Gregory-Aland numbering), is a Greek minuscule manuscript of the New Testament written on paper. Palaeographically it had been assigned to the 13th century.

Description 
The codex contains the text of the four Gospels, on paper leaves (size ). Number of the leaves is unknown. It had some lacunae (John 20:10-21:25).

The text is written in one column per page, 43 lines per page.

It contained a commentary (in Mark of Victorinus of Pettau, in Luke of Titus of Bostra).

The textual character of the codex is unknown because no one examined its readings.

History 
The manuscript was dated by Gregory to the 13th century.

The manuscript was found in Corfu by C. R. Gregory in 1886. It belonged to Archbishop Eustathius.

It was added to the list of New Testament manuscripts by Gregory (814e).

The manuscript was lost. Actual owner of the manuscript and place of its housing is unknown.

See also 

 List of New Testament minuscules
 Biblical manuscript
 Textual criticism
 Minuscule 813

References

Further reading 

 

Greek New Testament minuscules
13th-century biblical manuscripts
Lost biblical manuscripts